Shipperley is a surname. Notable people with the surname include:

Dave Shipperley (1952–2017), English footballer
Dom Shipperley (born 1991), Australian rugby league player
Neil Shipperley (born 1974), English footballer and manager
Zoe Shipperley (born 1990), English field hockey player